John Cyril Hawes  (7 September 1876 – 26 June 1956) was an architect and priest. Hawes was known for designing and constructing church buildings in England, Western Australia and The Bahamas. He served as a priest in the Church of England before converting to Roman Catholicism and received ordination as a Catholic priest. He was later named a Domestic Prelate by Pope Pius XI and given the title "monsignor". After retiring he lived as a hermit in The Bahamas, becoming known more commonly as Father Jerome.

Biography
Hawes was born in Richmond, Surrey to Edward, a solicitor, and Amelia Hawes. He attended school in Brighton and Canterbury. After leaving school he began training as an architect in London in 1893 with architects Edmeston and Gabriel. He also received formal architectural education at the Architectural Association School as well as the Central School of Arts and Craft.

In 1897 he began practising as an architect, designing houses at Bognor. After winning a design competition, Hawes was commissioned to build his first church in Gunnerton in 1899.

After studying at Lincoln Theological College he was ordained as a Church of England priest in 1903. After stints at Clerkenwell and Caldy Island he was posted to a mission in The Bahamas. In 1910 he designed St Paul's Church in Clarence Town on Long Island.

In 1911 he left The Bahamas for the United States where he converted to Roman Catholicism. After leading a nomadic existence in Canada and the United States for several years, including working as a labourer and as a railway teamster, he began studying for the priesthood in Rome. He was ordained a Catholic priest in Rome on 27 February 1915, after which he was sent to Geraldton, Western Australia where he worked as a priest, architect and builder. In recognition of his work in church design and architecture he was named a monsignor by Pope Pius XI.

In May 1939, Hawes sailed from Fremantle, returning to The Bahamas, officially on a pilgrimage. He designed and built the Mount Alvernia Hermitage on Como Hill at Cat Island, which became his home. Along with this hermitage, he also designed five churches in the Bahamas as well as a second church at Clarence Town, St Peter's.

He died on 26 June 1956 in Miami, Florida, aged 79 and at his own request was buried in a cave located beneath the hermitage at Cat Island.

Architecture Work

Monsignor Hawes' architectural work in the Mid West region of Western Australia was prolific. He was appointed Diocesan Architect and designed: 
 The Cathedral of St Francis Xavier, a Spanish Mission style cathedral in Geraldton. The completed building was officially opened in 1938
 Nazareth House in Geraldton
 The Cemetery Chapel of the Holy Spirit in Geraldton
 The Hermitage in Geraldton
 The Church of Our Lady of Mount Carmel in Mullewa
 Churches for many agricultural towns in the region; including Morawa, Western Australia|Morawa]], Perenjori, Western Australia|Perenjori]], Yalgoo and Northampton
 Only two private residences were designed - one being the homestead for Melangata Station north of Yalgoo, the other could be the [https://www.monsignorhawes.com.au/white-tower-bognor-regis/ White Tower} in Bognor Regis, UK, built as a holiday residence for him and his brothers with a single bedroom on each floor and a parlour.

The Monsignore Hawes Heritage Trail is a tourist route which visits many of these buildings, some of which he also built.

He also designed the Anglican Church of S. Christopher, in Gunnerton a small village in the North Tyne valley, Northumberland. The building has recently been restored and now boasts a fine stained glass window by William Tillyer in the west end.

See also
W.A. Heritage Trails Network

References

Further reading

 Evans, A. G. The conscious stone : a biography of John C. Hawes Melbourne : Polding Press, 1984.  (pbk.)
 Taylor, John  Between devotion and design : the architecture of John Cyril Hawes 1876-1956  Nedlands, W.A. : University of Western Australia Press, 2000. 
 Peter Anson The Hermit of Cat Island London: Burnes & Oates, 1958.
 Marshall, Steve The Builder Priest: The Buildings of Monsignor John Hawes in Western Australia : via Blurb 2012.  (hbk)
 Marshall, Steve Stone Upon Stone: The life and legacy of John Cyril Hawes2019

External Links
 Marshall Arts 

1876 births
1956 deaths
20th-century English architects
British Roman Catholics
Anglican priest converts to Roman Catholicism
20th-century English Anglican priests
History of Western Australia
People from Richmond, London
Architects from Surrey